Leurorthoceras is a genus of flattened actinoceratids with a siphuncle narrower than in Actinoceras, segments of which tend to become longer in the mature parts of the phragmocone, the chambered part of the shell. This fossil is known from the Middle Ordovician of North America, Europe, and Siberia.

References

Prehistoric nautiloid genera
Paleozoic life of Nunavut
Ordovician cephalopods of North America
Ordovician cephalopods of Europe